Morano sul Po (in Piedmontese Muran)  is a comune  in the  province of Alessandria, Piedmont, northwestern Italy.

Its immediate neighbours are:
Balzola, Camino, Casale Monferrato, Coniolo, Costanzana, Pontestura, and Trino.

References

Cities and towns in Piedmont